The Atauloma Girls School is a historic parochial school building in Afao village on the island of Tutuila in American Samoa. The London Missionary Society opened it in 1900 as the second secondary school on Tutuila (after the Fagalele Boys School), and the first to admit girls. For most of its history it prepared girls primarily to be pastors' wives, and after 1913 provided graduates to the nursing school at the naval station at Pago Pago. Its establishment saved Tutuila girls the necessity of travel to Upolu for secondary school, which separated them from their families and exposed them to the dangers of the international port at Apia. Atauloma was abandoned by 1970.

The school was listed on the United States National Register of Historic Places in 1972. It was featured on the television program Ghost Hunters International in its third-season episode "Ghoul's School" in 2012.

See also
National Register of Historic Places listings in American Samoa

References

External links

Schools in American Samoa
Tutuila
1900 establishments in American Samoa
Buildings and structures on the National Register of Historic Places in American Samoa
School buildings on the National Register of Historic Places
Educational institutions established in 1900
Girls' schools in Oceania